The Mapúa Cardinal Singers, formerly known as Mapúa Concert Singers, is the official resident choir of the Mapúa University in Intramuros, Metro Manila. The group is composed of male and female members who are passionately dedicated to the choral art.

Discography
In 2004, they joined Harmonies, a choral festival which was sponsored by University of Santo Tomas.  In 2005, they joined the National Music Competitions for Young Artists, (College Choir Category),  The Metro Chorale in 2006, sponsored by De La Salle University Chorale and Colors of Worship in 2006 and 2008, organized by the Manila Chamber Singers.

Awards

References

External links

 Mapúa Cardinal Singers official website at Weebly
 Mapúa Cardinal Singers at ChoralNet

University choirs
Filipino choirs
Musical groups from Manila
Musical groups established in 2000
Mapúa University
2000 establishments in the Philippines

pam:Mapúa Institute of Technology
tl:Mapua Institute of Technology